Raimkul Khudoynazarovich Malakhbekov (born 16 August 1974 in Dushanbe, Tajik SSR) is one of highest titled boxers of Russia, who won two Olympic medals in the Men's Bantamweight (54 kg) category.

Biography 
Malakhbekovs origins take root in Badakhshan of Tajikistan, which is also known as Pamir. He graduated from the Tajik Institute of Physical Culture, majoring in boxing.  His interest and passion for boxing grew when as a kid he visited the Dushanbe Sports Palace with his older brothers, who were training as boxers.

It is in Dushanbe that he met his future coach and mentor- Tsiren Balzanov (who was his trainer in Dushanbe initially, and after leaving to his native  Republic of Kalmykia of the Russian Federation, invited Raimkul to Kalmykia.

Although born and brought up in Tajikistan, Balzanov left after a civil war engulfed Tajikistan and his grandfather's name, noble status and part of property were rehabilitated. His grandfather is said to have been from a noble family, had high military rank, and numerous honors for his heroism in World War I, who was subjected to repression and expulsion to Kangurt of Tajikistan, where Balzanov was born.

In 1993, at the age of 19 Malakhbekov also left his home country- Tajikistan that was devastated from civil war for Russia to seek better opportunities. Initially, he settled in Moscow, but after reconnecting with his former trainer Balzanov he moved to Elista and restarted his boxing career. The right mixture of his unique physical conditioning, hard work and determination was noticed by his trainer promised a bright boxing career.

Boxing Career and achievements 
In his boxing career Malakhbekov won two Olympic medals in the Men's Bantamweight (54 kg) category. He also won the title at the World Amateur Boxing Championships in 1995 and 1997, and the European title in 1993 in Bursa, Turkey and 2002 in Perm, Russia. During his boxing career he has won seven times the Russian National Championships and numerous other tournaments. He was also among the winners of the 1998 Goodwill Games in New York USA.

Olympic results 
1996 (bronze medalist)
Defeated José Miguel Cotto (Puerto Rico) 16-6
Defeated Abdelaziz Boulehia (Algeria) RSC 3 (2:52)
Defeated Davaatseren Jamgan (Mongolia) 21-9
Lost to Arnaldo Mesa (Cuba) 14-14, referee decision

2000 (silver medalist)
Defeated Ceferino Labarda (Argentina) RSC 3
Defeated Theimuraz Khurtsilava (Georgia) 13-7
Defeated Alisher Rahimov (Uzbekistan) 16-10
Defeated Sergey Danilchenko (Ukraine) 15-10
Lost to Guillermo Rigondeaux Ortiz (Cuba) 12-18

End of Boxing Career 
Malakhbekov officially ended his career after his last fight at the European Championship in Perm in 2002, in which he won the gold medal. He said in an interview to a journalist that "the sport is becoming more and more business oriented, rather than art oriented".

Personal life 
Malakhbekov is married to Sokina and lives in Elista. His hobby is cars. He loves cars and owns a Jaguar.  He is enjoying his new profession of politician as a delegate to the parliament of Kalmykia and an advisor to the President for Physical Education and Sports. He also enjoys the status of an Honored Hero of Kalmykia and Honored Master of Sports of Russia, Order of Friendship and Order for Merits before the country of second degree.

External links 
 Tajiks in Russia

1974 births
Living people
Tajikistani male boxers
Boxers at the 1996 Summer Olympics
Boxers at the 2000 Summer Olympics
Olympic boxers of Russia
Olympic silver medalists for Russia
Olympic bronze medalists for Russia
Sportspeople from Dushanbe
Olympic medalists in boxing
Tajikistani emigrants to Russia
Russian people of Tajikistani descent
Soviet male boxers
Russian male boxers
AIBA World Boxing Championships medalists
Medalists at the 2000 Summer Olympics
Medalists at the 1996 Summer Olympics
Bantamweight boxers
Competitors at the 1998 Goodwill Games